is a Japanese historical drama television series and the 58th NHK taiga drama. It stars Nakamura Kankurō VI and Sadao Abe as marathon runner Shiso Kanakuri and swimming coach Masaji Tabata respectively. It began broadcasting in 2019 as part of the lead up to the 2020 Summer Olympics for which NHK was, under the Japan Consortium, principal co-host broadcaster. This drama marks the 55th anniversary of the 1964 Summer Olympics, which the NHK broadcast. It is the second post-war taiga drama in NHK history (the first was Inochi: Life in 1986) and the last series to premiere in the Heisei era and the first series to air during the Reiwa era. The series received an average rating of 8.2%, the lowest in history for a taiga drama.

Plot
The drama focuses on the stories of two Japanese Olympians from different times of the 20th century: marathon runner Shiso Kanakuri, who took part in the 1912 Stockholm Summer Olympics and one of the first Japanese athletes to compete in the Games, and swimming coach Masaji Tabata, known as a founding father of Japanese swimming and was part of the successful efforts to bring the Olympics to Japan.

Cast

Starring
Nakamura Kankurō VI as Shiso Kanakuri, a marathon runner
Rintarō Hisano as child Shiso
Daichirō Funamoto as teen Shiso
Sadao Abe as Masaji Tabata, a reporter and swimming coach
Sōma Yamatoki as young Masaji (early teens)
Yūya Hara as young Masaji (late teens and early twenties)

Kanakuri family
Nakamura Shidō II as Sanetsugu Kanakuri, Shiso's brother
Tomorowo Taguchi as Nobuhiko Kanakuri, Shiso's father
Yoshiko Miyazaki as Shie Kanakuri, Shiso's mother
Hisako Ōkata as Suma Kanakuri, Shiso's grandmother

Ikebe family
Haruka Ayase as Suya Haruno, Shiso's wife
Riri Harashima as young Suya
Shinobu Otake as Ikue Ikebe, Shiso's adoptive mother
Yō Takahashi as Shigeyuki Ikebe, Suya's deceased husband

Tabata family
Kumiko Asō as Kikue, Masaji's wife
Toshie Negishi as Ura Tabata, Masaji's mother
Haruka Uchimura as Shōkichi Tabata, Masaji's older brother
Ai Yoshikawa as Atsuko Tabata, Masaji's daughter

Mishima family
Toma Ikuta as Yahiko Mishima
Yukiyoshi Ozawa as Yatarō Mishima
Kayoko Shiraishi as Wakako Mishima, Yahiko and Yatarō's mother

Shiso's friends
Hana Sugisaki as Shima, Gorin's grandmother, and Riku, Gorin's mother
Tasuku Emoto as Masuno, Shima's husband and Riku's father 
Taiga Nakano as Masaru Komatsu, Riku's husband and Gorin's father
Hiroki Miyake as Shinsaku Kurosaka (eps. 16 onwards)
Pierre Taki as Shinsaku Kurosaka (eps. 4–10)
Mayumi Satō as Chō Kurosaka, Shinsaku's wife
Ryo Katsuji as Hidenobu Mikawa
201 Ami as Sanpo Toku

JOC / Japan Amateur Athletic Association
Kōji Yakusho as Jigorō Kanō, the 1st President of the Japanese Olympic Committee
Ryō Iwamatsu as Seiichi Kishi, the 2nd President
Jun Inoue as Juichi Tsushima, the 7th President
Yutaka Takenouchi as Hyozo Omori, the team manager at the 1912 Stockholm Olympics
Charlotte Kate Fox as Annie Shepley Omori, Hyozo's wife
Kanji Furutachi as Isao Kani
Tetta Sugimoto as Dōmei Nagai
Toshiyuki Nagashima as Chiyosaburō Takeda
Kazunaga Tsuji as Hisayoshi Kanō
Shinobu Terajima as Tokuyo Nikaidō
Tori Matsuzaka as Yukiaki Iwata
Yutaka Matsushige as Ryotaro Azuma, the Governor of Tokyo
Miō Tanaka as Tadaoki Yamamoto

Japanese members of the IOC
Masaya Kato as Yōtarō Sugimura
Shinya Tsukamoto as Michimasa Soejima

Japan Swimming Federation
Sarutoki Minagawa as Ikkaku Matsuzawa

The people living in Asakusa
Takeshi Kitano as Kokontei Shinshō V / the storyteller
Mirai Moriyama as Kōzō Minobe (young Shinshō) / the storyteller
Shino Ikenami as Rin Minobe, Shinshō's wife
Kaho as young Rin
Ryunosuke Kamiki as Gorin
Ai Hashimoto as Koume
Kazunobu Mineta as Sei-san
Suzuki Matsuo as Tachibanaya Enkyō IV, Shinshō's master
Tokio Emoto as Manchō
Rina Kawaei as Chie, Gorin's lover
Yoshiyoshi Arakawa as Imamatsu
Kyōko Koizumi as Mitsuko, Shinshō's eldest daughter
Maki Sakai as Kimiko, Shinshō's second daughter 
Nakamura Shichinosuke II as Sanyūtei Enshō VI

Asahi Shimbun
Lily Franky as Taketora Ogata, Masaji's boss
Kenta Kiritani as Ichirō Kōno, Masaji's rival
Hiroto Ōshita as young Ichirō
Kazuhiro Yamaji as Ryōhei Murayama
Jirō (Sissonne) as Odaka

Tengu Club
Shinnosuke Mitsushima as Shinkei Yoshioka
Koen Kondo as Rinsen Nakazawa
Sō Takei as Shunrō Oshikawa

Other athletes

Kento Nagayama as Genzaburō Noguchi 
Koharu Sugawara as Kinue Hitomi
Rintarō Ikeda as Chūhei Nambu
Naruki Matsukawa as Mikio Oda
Yūsuke Gambale as Sohn Kee-chung, a.k.a. Son Kitei
Kai Inowaki as Yoshinori Sakai
Mikuri Kiyota as Kumie Suzuki
Ken Sugawara as Kōkichi Tsuburaya

Takumi Saitoh as Katsuo Takaishi
Takahiro Miura as Kazuo Noda
Moka Kamishiraishi as Hideko Maehata
Shunsuke Daitō as Yoshiyuki Tsuruta
Kento Hayashi as Tsutomu Ōyokota
Ōshirō Maeda as Reizo Koike
Mai Kiryū as Hatsuho Matsuzawa
Arisa Sasaki as Kazue Kojima
Nagisa Nishino as Yukie Arata
Yūta Uchida as Masaji Kiyokawa
Jun Nishiyama as Yasuji Miyazaki
Kosuke Kitajima as Hironoshin Furuhashi
Daisuke Hosokawa as Shiro Hashizume

Sakura Ando as Masae Kasai
Miho Izumikawa as Emiko Miyamoto
Koharu Sakai as Kinuko Tanida
Nagisa Matsunaga as Yuriko Handa
Shen Tanaka as Yoshiko Matsumura
Miyū Kitamuki as Sata Isobe
Yūko Watanabe as Emiko Suzuki

Other politicians
Tadanobu Asano as Shōjirō Kawashima, the secretary-general of the LDP 
Issey Ogata as Hidejirō Nagata
Kitarō as Toratarō Ushizuka
Kenichi Hagiwara as Korekiyo Takahashi
Sansei Shiomi as Tsuyoshi Inukai
Sei Hiraizumi as Shigenobu Ōkuma, the founder of Waseda University
Kenta Hamano as Hirobumi Itō
Katsuya Kobayashi as Gorō Miura
Tatekawa Danshun as Hayato Ikeda
Hideaki Matsunaga as Kōichi Kido 
Hiroshi Ōkōchi as Kenji Fukunaga

Foreigners
Nicolas Lumbreras as Pierre de Coubertin , the founder of the IOC
Jappe Claes as Henri de Baillet-Latour , the third president of the IOC
Michael Sorich as Avery Brundage , the fifth president of the IOC
Don Johnson as Avery Brundage  in 1930's
Dasha Teranishi as Mrs. Brundage 
Dino Spinella as Benito Mussolini 
Francesco Biscione as Alberto Bonacossa 
Daniel Schuster as Adolf Hitler 
Huang Shi as Wang Zhengting  
Laz B as William May Garland 
Didier as Auguste Gérard 
Eduardo Breda as Francisco Lázaro  
Edvin Endre as Daniel , an interpreter
Max Backholm as Paul Zerling  
Marc-Olivier Caron as Buster Crabbe  
Marthe Romund as Martha Genenger  
Kai Hoshino Sandy as Jacob , an interpreter
Derebe as Abebe Bikila  
Danny Winn as Douglas MacArthur 
Steve Wiley as Edwin O. Reischauer 
Lutfi Bakhtiyar as Sukarno 
Eduwart Manalu as Allen , an interpreter
Raja as Guru Dutt Sondhi 
Alioune as Léon Yombe  
Max as Henri Elendé

NHK
Gen Hoshino as Kazushige Hirasawa, a foreign affairs commentator
Tortoise Matsumoto as Sansei Kasai
Masato Wada as Teru Yamamoto
Daichi Watanabe (Kuroneko Chelsea) as Hisaya Morishige
Taishi Masaoka as Seigorō Kitade

Other journalists
Mizuki Yamamoto as Honjō
Sō Yamanaka as Zenmaro Toki

Other people related to the 1964 Summer Olympics
Ryuhei Matsuda as Kenzō Tange, an architect
Kōki Mitani as Kon Ichikawa, a film director
Kenta Hamano as Haruo Minami, a singer
Daisuke Kuroda as Nobuo Murakami, a chef
Tetsu Hirahara as Kenkichi Oshima
Kenta Maeno as Yūsaku Kamekura, a graphic designer
Umika Kawashima as Yasuko Ōgawara, an interpreter
Taro Suruga as Haruhide Matsushita, an aircraft pilot 
Ren Sudō as Tadamasa Fukiura
Yoshimi Tokui (Tutorial) as Hirofumi Daimatsu
Akihiro Kakuta (Tokyo 03) as Eiichi Morinishi, a taxi driver
Cunning Takeyama as the owner of Suimeitei
Hideto Iwai as Hideo Kitahara
Shinshō Nakamaru as Shigeru Yosano

Others
Hiroko Yakushimaru as Marie
Yuina Kuroshima as Tomie Murata
Itsuji Itao as Daisaku Murata, Tomie's father
Hajime Inoue as Sadatsuchi Uchida
Kenta Satoi as Dr. Haruno, Suya's father
Bengal as Kinji Tajima
Raikō Sakamoto as a katsudō-benshi
Kang Sang-jung as Mr. Gojō
Hiroaki Nerio as a man with a mustache
Shiyun Nakamura as Count Maresuke Nogi
Makita Sports as a prisoner
Moemi Katayama as Chii-chan
Lisa Oda as Naomi
Shōko Nakajima as Mitsue Maehata, Hideko's mother
Suon Kan as Fukutarō Maehata, Hideko's father
Naozumi Masuko (Dohatsuten) as Akira Kurosawa, a film director
Tetsuya Chiba as Yoshijirō Umezu
Ryosuke Otani as Ryōzō Hiranuma
Yamagen (Charcoal Zone) as Sadaharu Oh
Mariko Tsutsui as Teruko, Ryotaro Azuma's wife
Mitsuru Fukikoshi
Kankurō Kudō as a taxi driver

Production

Music – Otomo Yoshihide

On November 16, 2016, NHK announced that its 58th taiga drama will be about Japan's participation in the Olympic Games from 1912 up to 1964, with Kankurō Kudō as writer and Tsuyoshi Inoue as chief director. The drama series' title, Idaten: Tokyo Orinpikku-banashi (subtitle: "A Tale of the Tokyo Olympics"), was revealed on April 4, 2017.

Casting
The main cast of the series was announced on November 1, 2017, which included Nakamura Kankurō VI, Sadao Abe, Haruka Ayase, Toma Ikuta, Hana Sugisaki, Kento Nagayama, and Ryo Katsuji among others. The second cast announcement on November 29, 2017, included Takeshi Kitano as Kokontei Shinshō V. The third cast announcement on March 30, 2018, included Tomorowo Taguchi, Yoshiko Miyazaki, Kenta Satoi, and Yō Takahashi. The fourth cast announcement on December 14, 2018, included Gen Hoshino, Tori Matsuzaka, and Yutaka Matsushige. The fifth cast announcement on March 5, 2019, included Shinobu Terajima, Yuina Kuroshima, Koharu Sugawara, Kaho, and Itsuji Itao. Two more cast announcements were done on April 24 and May 17, 2019.

On March 12, 2019, actor-musician Masanori "Pierre" Taki, who portrayed the role of tabi craftsman Shinsaku Kurosaka, was arrested in Tokyo due to his admission of drug use. This came after authorities searched his home in Setagaya Ward and tested him positive for cocaine use from a urine sample. He was eventually replaced by Hiroki Miyake in the series.

TV schedule

Highlight

International version

Home media
The first 13 episodes and 11 succeeding episodes of Idaten will be released in separate Blu-ray box sets in Japan on April 24, 2020. DVD edition box sets will also released on the same day. Episodes 25 to 36 and 37 to 47 will later be released in separate Blu-ray box sets as well on May 22, 2020, along with their respective DVD versions.

Soundtracks
Idaten Taiga Drama Original Soundtrack (Release date: March 6, 2019)
Idaten Taiga Drama Original Soundtrack Part Two (Release date: July 24, 2019)
Idaten Taiga Drama Original Soundtrack Final (Release date: November 20, 2019)

Awards

Memorable quotes
 Jigorō Kanō: We mustn't burden athletes with the pressure to win. It's about competing fairly, for peace. Competing with respect for your opponent. That's the spirit of the Olympics, just like Japan's martial arts. (IDATEN The Epic Marathon to Tokyo: Episode 1)
 Jigorō Kanō: Earlier, I dreamt of an Idaten (god of running). He was so fast. He had the legs of an antelope. The face of an elephant. Holding a victory cup. (IDATEN The Epic Marathon to Tokyo: Episode 1)
 Jigorō Kanō: (To Shiso Kanakuri) Look! 2 hours, 32 minutes, 45 seconds. You've broken the world record! Kanakuri, you're our Idaten to take on the world! (IDATEN The Epic Marathon to Tokyo: Episode 1)
 Shiso Kanakuri: (Writing in his diary) July 6, 1912, Sunny. The day has arrived. Mishima holds the flag, I hold the placard. No other athletes on our team. A procession of two. (IDATEN The Epic Marathon to Tokyo: Episode 2)
 Shiso Kanakuri: (To Yahiko Mishima, who has lost his self-confidence after training with towering Westerners) Our one step forward is a step for all Japanese! Don't forget that. No matter how fast or slow we are, our steps have meaning! (IDATEN The Epic Marathon to Tokyo: Episode 2)
 Portuguese Athlete: (Mourning the death of his teammate Francisco Lázaro, who has competed with Shiso Kanakuri in the marathon and collapsed during the race at the 1912 Stockholm Olympics) Lázaro... Such a poor man... Such a poor man. 42 degrees of fever. He's been rushed to the hospital. And in his death bed, he's still running. He's always running... always running... until his last breath. (IDATEN The Epic Marathon to Tokyo: Episode 2)
 Masaji Tabata: (To Korekiyo Takahashi, Japanese Minister of Finance) We can't just rely on donations anymore. In rich countries, sports are popular nationwide. You politicians should use sports to your advantage. Give us money, and you'll have a say. (IDATEN The Epic Marathon to Tokyo: Episode 3)
 Kinue Hitomi: (After losing the women's 100m sprint in semifinals at the 1928 Amsterdam Olympics, wildly sobbing) May I run in the 800 tomorrow? Men can go home defeated, but a woman cannot. They'll say women are no good. They'll laugh and say it's pointless to try and run like a man! I'm carrying the hopes of all female athletes. All their dreams will end because of me! (IDATEN The Epic Marathon to Tokyo: Episode 3)
 Japanese-American Old Man: (To Masaji Tabata, just after the Japanese swimming team has won a bunch of medals at the 1932 Los Angeles Olympics) Today, a white person spoke to me. What do you think he said? [...] "Are you Japanese? Congratulations!" [...] What's important is he talked to me. It's been 27 years since I came to the United States. This was the first time. A white person holding my hand, saying, "Congratulations! Congratulations!" I've never been happier in my life. (IDATEN The Epic Marathon to Tokyo: Episode 3)
 Hideko Maehata: (To Masaji Tabata) Stop saying Ganbare (Do your best)! If doing my best was good enough, I would've won in Los Angeles!  (IDATEN The Epic Marathon to Tokyo: Episode 4)
 Martha Genenger: (To Hideko Maehata, just after losing to Maehata in the women's 200m breaststroke event at the 1936 Berlin Olympics, with a big smile) Let's swim again sometime!  (IDATEN The Epic Marathon to Tokyo: Episode 4)
 Reizo Koike: My cousin enlisted [as a soldier]. We're basically the same age. I feel guilty. I can't focus on swimming. (IDATEN The Epic Marathon to Tokyo: Episode 4)
 Masaji Tabata: (To Jigorō Kanō, who is adamant about holding the Olympic Games in Tokyo on schedule) I beg you. Please... Give back the Games. We can't do this. It's disrespectful to the Olympics under these circumstances. I understand how you feel. It's excruciatingly embarrassing. But know this. The only person who can do it, is you. [...] Is this the Japan you want to show the world? [...] Think of the future. Think! If you gracefully bow out now, after the war we'll have another chance. (IDATEN The Epic Marathon to Tokyo: Episode 4)
 Masaji Tabata: (As Japan was occupied by the Allied Powers and not allowed to take part in the 1948 London Olympics) I was enraged, so we held The Other Olympics. [...] Same day, same time as the swimming events. The exact same schedule. (IDATEN The Epic Marathon to Tokyo: Episode 5)
 Masaji Tabata: (To Kazushige Hirasawa, who is not keen on Tokyo becoming the host city for the 1964 Olympics) We did some awful, disgusting things in Asia. We must do something fun for people!  Too early? You must be kidding. It's almost too late! (IDATEN The Epic Marathon to Tokyo: Episode 5)
 Kazushige Hirasawa: (At an IOC session to select the host city for the 1964 Olympics) I have here with me a textbook used by the sixth graders at Japanese primary schools. Seven pages of this textbook are devoted to an article called "The Flag with Five Circles." The article begins this way. "Olympics. Olympics. Our hearts jump a bit when we hear these words. Athletes gather from all over the world, hoisting aloft their national flags. The athletes compete against each other under the same rules and the same conditions. Peoples from widely separated parts of the world develop friendship while vying for victory. It might be said that the Olympic Games form the biggest festival of youth dedicated to peace." Is this not the time for the fifth continent represented by the Olympic Circles to let the Olympic Games come to the continent Asia? (IDATEN The Epic Marathon to Tokyo: Episode 5)
 Masaji Tabata: (To Yukiaki Iwata, watching together the closing ceremony of the 1964 Tokyo Olympics, where the athletes rush the field, sometimes arm in arm or riding piggyback, in a disorganized and chaotic spectacle) Iwata, once more, I need to... express my gratitude. Thank you. It was perfect! They were my Olympics. Now they're everybody's! (IDATEN The Epic Marathon to Tokyo: Episode 6)

See also

2020 Summer Olympics

References

External links
Drama: IDATEN The Epic Marathon to Tokyo  (NHK World)
Official Site  (The program website of The Taiga Drama‟ IDATEN” is limited to browsing in Japan only.)

Taiga drama
2020 Summer Olympics
2019 Japanese television series debuts
2019 Japanese television series endings
1912 Summer Olympics
1964 Summer Olympics
Cultural depictions of Benito Mussolini
Cultural depictions of Adolf Hitler
Television series set in the 19th century
Television series set in the 1900s
Television series set in the 1910s
Television series set in the 1920s
Television series set in 1931
Television series set in 1932
Television series set in 1959
Television series set in 1960
Television series set in 1964
Works about the Summer Olympics
Television shows set in Kumamoto Prefecture
Television shows set in Shizuoka Prefecture